Should a Husband Forgive? is a 1919 American drama film written and directed by Raoul Walsh. The film stars Miriam Cooper, Beatrice Beckley, Eric Mayne, Vincent Coleman, Lyster Chambers and Percy Standing. The film was released on November 1, 1919, by Fox Film Corporation.

Plot

Cast            
Miriam Cooper as Ruth Fulton
Beatrice Beckley as Mary Carroll 
Eric Mayne as John Carroll
Vincent Coleman as John Carroll Jr.
Lyster Chambers as Rogue
Percy Standing as Rex Burleigh
Charles Craig as A Human Jackal 
Martha Mansfield as The Girl Who Was Cast Aside
James Marcus as Uncle Jim
Johnny Ries as Kid Dugan
Tom Burke as Josephus McCarthy

References

External links
 

1919 films
1910s English-language films
Silent American drama films
1919 drama films
Fox Film films
Films directed by Raoul Walsh
American silent feature films
American black-and-white films
1910s American films